Nesioneta elegans is a species of sheet weaver spiders (family Linyphiidae). It is found on the Caroline Islands and on Fiji.

References 

 Nesioneta elegans at the World Spider Catalog

Linyphiidae
Spiders of Oceania
Spiders described in 1991
Fauna of the Caroline Islands
Spiders of Fiji